Piotr Pierzchała (born 29 June 1999) is a Polish professional footballer who plays as a defender.

Club career
On 24 August 2020 he joined Pogoń Siedlce on a season-long loan.

References

External links

1999 births
Sportspeople from Kielce
Living people
Polish footballers
Association football defenders
Korona Kielce players
MKP Pogoń Siedlce players
Wigry Suwałki players
Ekstraklasa players
II liga players
III liga players